Bonthu Rammohan (born 5 July 1973) is an Indian politician who was the Mayor of GHMC Hyderabad from 2016 to 2020. He belongs to the Telangana Rashtra Samithi (TRS) party. Bonthu has become the first mayor of Hyderabad after the formation of Telangana.

Early life
Bonthu was born in the village of Amanagal in the district of Warangal to Venkatayya and Kamalamma.

Personal life
He is married with Sridevi on 7 February 2004 and has two daughters: Kujitha and Ushasri.

Education and student politics
He completed his primary and secondary education in Mahabubabad and later attended SSC Junior College for his higher secondary education. Bonthu initially attended Adarsh College in Warangal for his tertiary education, but later transferred to Osmania University in Hyderabad.

As a student of Osmania University, he took an interest in student politics. He was an ABVP leader in his time in university and was quite active in the organisation.

Political career
His political career started in 2002 just after the TRS party was born with an agenda to achieve separate statehood. He left the ABVP to join the TRS and participated actively in the agitation. This eventually led him to being appointed the TRS Youth Wing State President by party chief K. Chandrashekar Rao.
Rammohan tried very hard for uppal seat in 2018.He is also one of the
Active participant in Trs party bahiranga sabhas, He looks arrangements of bhairanga sabhas with other trs party  leaders during Telangana moment  .

References

Living people
Mayors of Hyderabad, India
Telangana politicians
Telangana Rashtra Samithi politicians
1973 births